Abdulrahman Al-Ghamdi may refer to:

 Abdulrahman Al-Ghamdi (footballer, born 1986), Saudi footballer for Al-Selmiyah
 Abdulrahman Al-Ghamdi (footballer, born 1994), Saudi footballer for Al-Ittihad

See also
 Abdul Rahman Al-Ghamdi (born 1974), citizen of Saudi Arabia believed to have been a jihadist